Strata Design 3D CX is a commercial 3D modeling, rendering and animation program developed in St. George, Utah by Corastar, Inc. dba Strata Software. Strata is a pioneer and developer of 3D design software.

Strata Design 3D CX 8 is the latest incarnation of a program that was originally named StrataVision 3D. It is best known as an all-purpose 3D modeling application with photo-real rendering ability, ease of use and tight integration with Adobe Photoshop. Strata 3D is targeted at the illustration/multimedia market rather than at the movie/games market.

Strata 3D software in its various iterations has received awards and praise from many sources including MacUser UK, Digit Magazine, Layers Magazine, DigitalArts, MacWorld, and Photoshop User.

History 
Strata 3D was one of the first desktop 3D graphics applications, releasing its first application, StrataVision 3D, in 1989. The company was formed by brothers Ken and Gary Bringhurst.

By 1996, the company was among the top five private employers in southern Utah. The Bringhurst brothers and their company have stayed in their scenic red rock home near St. George, Utah. Ken Bringhurst serves as the company's Executive Chairman, while Gary Bringhurst is the Chief Technology Officer.

As of September 2016, John Wright is President and Chief Executive Officer.

Move into VR/AR 
Strata announced initial funding for its move into augmented reality (AR) and virtual reality (VR) September 22, 2016.

Greg Kofford, a co-founder of Lanstead Investors PTY Limited, managed the funding; company changes include the appointment of John Wright as president and managing director.

Strata plans to give users the ability to view and sell design projects using VR and AR headsets, and offer custom VR/AR development.

Strata Design 3D CX features 
Strata Design 3D CX 8.1 is the latest version of the product and contains numerous upgrades, improvements, and enhancements.
 Rendering features. Strata Design 3D CX is famous for its high-quality rendering ability – rendering being the creation of a finished, final image. Rendering features include:
 Embree Raycasting by Intel, added in v8.1, improves rendering speed by 300 to 800 percent. 
 Preview renderers include LiveRay, which generates a fully raytraced rendering the object or scene. Several variations of OpenGL and Toon rendering are also available for previewing a model or scene.
 Raydiosity and raytracing rendering options include many customization options such as rendering to an alpha channel, rendering to Photoshop layers, gamma control, and the ability to load or save custom render settings. 
 Other options include blurry transparency and reflectivity, instance rendering, shadows, soft shadows, MIP mapping, specular highlight, anti-matter effects and stereoscopic rendering.
 Texturing features include a palette of hundreds of premade surface textures and the ability to create new ones using features like live-linking to native Adobe Photoshop and Illustrator files – make a change in Photoshop or Illustrator and the model surface is automatically updated.
 Texture channels include diffuse color, reflection color, specular, reflection amount, embedded amount, anisotropy, opacity, smoothness, index of refraction, glow factor, bump, normal, shadow cast map and mask.
 Other features include native UV mapping, scripting, hierarchical control, normal maps, and a variety of premade and customizable volumetric and solid textures including fog, haze, mist, and clouds. 
 Conform to Mesh UV mapping uses LSCM (least squares conformal maps) technology. LSCM unwrap options include unwrapping entire objects, singe UV island or only selected polygons. Commands available for unwrapping are pin, fit, fit each, rotate connected, move to, select perimeter, assign UV edge seam
 LiveRay texture preview allows the user to see texture changes directly in the modeling view.
 Quick texture settings include glossiness and transparency, allowing a rapid way to adjust basic texture attributes.
 Premade display scenes included with the application allow users to stage an object or model in one of 29 premade indoor and outdoor templates, including white and dark studios and premade shelving displays. Premade templates include optimized lights and lightdomes.
 Modeling features include Bézier splines, polygons, quad polysplines (subdivision surfaces), metasurfaces, extrude, lathe, Boolean, skin and mirror.
 Viewing features include Quick OpenGL previews and LiveRay photo-real previews, familiar interface, split view, camera view, multiple views, depth cueing, image/movie backdrop, and spotlight views.
 Environment features include a ground plane, air refraction, visible and reflective backgrounds, atmosphere, gravity, and wind.
 Lighting features available in Design 3D CX 8.x include point lights, spot lights, global lights, glowing surfaces, Lightdome HDRI, intensity, soft edges, host objects, ambient light, animatable lights, gels, light effects, and HDR Light Studio integration (optional).
 Special effects include lens flare, auras, particles, scriptable effects, fountains, fire, smoke, hair, hotspots, pixie dust. Also included are global gravity, wind force and air control.
 File import/export capabilities include U3D (in), Collada (in/out), Illustrator/EPS (in), Photoshop PSD (in/out), STL (in/out), XMM (out), Quicktime (in/out), PICT (in/out), Quicktime VR (out), TGA (in/out), TIFF (in/out), BMP (in/out), JPEG (in/out), 3DS (in), PDF (in), DXF (in/out), AVI (in/out), MiniCAD (in), Amapi (in/out), OBJ (in/out), VRML 1 & 2 (in/out), Flash SWF (out), True Type Fonts (in), and Postscript Type Fonts (in)
 Animation features. In Design 3D, everything can be animated. Features include scripting, hierarchical animation, visible paths, animation previews, event-based convert to path, key frames, velocity graphs, 'life' control, align to path, inverse and forward kinematics, and proportional event scaling. Path types available are TCB, spline and natural. Animation effects allow users to shatter, explode, and jiggle objects.
 Drawing features include 2D/3D text, 2D drawing tools, 3D primitives and spline curves.

Versions 
The current version of Strata 3D is Strata Design 3D CX 8.1 which adds Embree Raycasting from Intel.

Design 3D CX 8.0 added a 64-bit renderer with expanded memory handling and better handling of very large renderings. Other rendering improvements included a new dialog which added control of gamma, brightness and black point along with the ability to render to High Dynamic Range images (HDRI). Other notable additions were a Publish command for exporting objects to 3D print services including Augment, Sketchfab, and iMaterialise. Lighting improvements include integration with HDR Light Studio. 
New features in Design 3D CX 7.5 included UV editing tools such as Conform, (unwrap), seam marking in poly meshes, and new UV edit tools. Modeling enhancements include a Decimate command, new poly editing selection methods and tools, STL (.stl) file import and export for 3D printing, and support for bump/normal maps in Collada import/export.
The Design 3D CX 7.0 release in 2012 included numerous texture enhancements such as anisotropy and normal map support, blurry transparency and subsets for applying different textures to different groups of polygons in the same object. Also included in v7 is a full UV editor, new polygon selection and editing tools, render and speed improvements. Rendering enhancements include support blurry reflections and blurry transparency, and adaptive surface sampling.
In 2009, Design 3D CX 6 added HDRI lighting, new grid and guide functionality, multiple polygon editing tools, edit tools for lathe, bezier, extrude, and path extruded objects, new texture channels and controls including Fresnel interpolation, new photon rendering, and rendering quality and speed improvements. Version 6 also added tighter integration with Adobe Photoshop CS4 Extended via a set of plug-ins. Design 3D's Model, TexturePaint, Match and Render plug-ins allowed users to easily send models back and forth from Photoshop to create, edit and texture 3D content.
The Design 3D CX 5.x releases beginning in 2006 included subdivision surfaces (Catmull–Clark algorithm–based polygon smoothing), scripting via the Lua programming language, and rendering to Photoshop layers. This release offered new subdivision tools, scripting support, bones and IK system, and a history palette.
The Strata 3D CX v4.x releases in 2004 included Polygon modeling tools and Subdivision Surface modeling (SDS).
In 2002, Strata 3Dbase and Strata 3Dpro (version 3) added functionality such as toon rendering and photon mapping.
By 1999, Strata StudioPro 2.53 offered numerous new features, including a choice of QuicDraw 3D or OpenGL for onscreen rendering, multiple viewing options to speed up redraws as well as the ability to convert 3D primitives into skin, Bézier, polygon mesh objects. Other features included texture previews, path extrude, boolean operations, skin (loft) and extrude; and special effects such as fountains, lens flare, fog, mist   
Strata StudioPro 1.75 Blitz in 1996 added support of QuickDraw 3D, multiprocessor support, VRML export and the Raytracing renderer.   
In 1993 Strata StudioPro 1.5 was added to the product line, with StrataVision remaining a reduced-feature "light" version.   
StrataVision 2.0 introduced the Raydiosity rendering algorithm (a variant of radiosity) along with more powerful modeling features, faster rendering, basic animation and extensibility.   
StrataVision was released as the first product of the Strata company in 1988 to facilitate professional 3D graphics on regular desktop Macs. This first release provided high-end modeling and 3D rendering tools.

References

External links

Strata Software Support home
Strata 3D User Community
Strata 3D University

3D graphics software
Animation software
Lua (programming language)-scriptable software
3D computer graphics software for Linux
Proprietary commercial software for Linux